Alan Kamara (born 15 July 1958) is an English former footballer who played 339 matches in the Football League for York City, Darlington, Scarborough and  Halifax Town.

References

1958 births
Living people
Footballers from Sheffield
English footballers
Association football defenders
Kiveton Park F.C. players
York City F.C. players
Darlington F.C. players
Burton Albion F.C. players
Scarborough F.C. players
Halifax Town A.F.C. players
English Football League players
Halifax Town A.F.C. non-playing staff